The 1792 State of the Union Address was delivered by George Washington to Congress on Tuesday, November 6, 1792.  It was presented in Philadelphia's Congress Hall.  He said,

The results of your common deliberations hitherto will, I trust, be productive of solid and durable advantages to our constituents, such as, by conciliating more and more their ultimate suffrage, will tend to strengthen and confirm their attachment to that Constitution of Government upon which, under Divine Providence, materially depend their union, their safety, and their happiness. 

Still further to promote and secure these inestimable ends there is nothing which can have a more powerful tendency than the careful cultivation of harmony, combined with a due regard to stability, in the public councils.

References

State of the Union addresses
Presidency of George Washington
Speeches by George Washington
State of the Union Address
State of the Union Address
State of the Union Address
State of the Union Address
2nd United States Congress